Convoy is a 1978 American road action comedy film directed by Sam Peckinpah and starring Kris Kristofferson, Ali MacGraw, Ernest Borgnine, Burt Young, Madge Sinclair and Franklyn Ajaye.  The film is based on the 1975 country and western novelty song "Convoy" by C. W. McCall. The film was made when the CB radio/trucking craze was at its peak in the United States, and followed the similarly themed films White Line Fever (1975) and Smokey and the Bandit (1977). The film received mixed reviews from critics; however, it was the most commercially successful film of Peckinpah's career.

Plot

In the Arizona desert, truck driver Martin "Rubber Duck" Penwald is passed by a woman in a Jaguar XK-E, then runs into fellow truck drivers Pig Pen/Love Machine and Spider Mike, when another "trucker" informs them over the C.B. that they are okay to increase their speed. The "trucker" turns out to be Sheriff "Dirty Lyle" Wallace, a long-time nemesis of the Duck, who extorts them for $70 each.

The truckers head on to Rafael's Glide-In where the Duck's sometime girlfriend and Lyle's wife, Violet, works as a waitress. Melissa, the driver of the XK-E, is also there; her Jaguar broke down and she had to sell it and some of her belongings in an effort reach Dallas, as she's on her way to look for a job. The Duck offers Melissa a ride; Violet is unimpressed and ushers him away to give him a special birthday present. While they're away, Wallace shows up at the Glide-In checking plates. Pig Pen and Spider Mike start making fun of Wallace over the diner's base-station CB radio, leading to Wallace attempting to arrest Spider Mike for "vagrancy". The Duck enters and tries to smooth things over, but Mike punches Wallace, leading to a brawl in the diner when some troopers arrive to assist Wallace. The assorted truckers prevail, and decide to head for the state line to avoid prosecution.

The truckers drive across Arizona and New Mexico, with Wallace and the police in pursuit. Duck leads the truckers off the main highway and down a rough dusty desert trail, causing several of the police cars to crash, while Wallace's vehicle is crushed between Pig Pen and Spider Mike's rigs. As the rebellious truckers evade and confront the police, Rubber Duck becomes a reluctant hero.

The Governor of New Mexico, Jerry Haskins, meets Rubber Duck. About the same time, Wallace and a brutal Texas sheriff arrest Spider Mike (who had left the convoy to be with his wife after she gave birth to their son) in Alvarez, Texas. Wallace's plan is to use Mike as "bait" to trap Rubber Duck. A janitor at the jail, aware of the plan, send messages by CB radio that Spider Mike has been wrongfully arrested and beaten. Various truckers relay the message to New Mexico.

Rubber Duck ends the meeting with Haskins and leaves to rescue Spider Mike. Several other truckers join him and head east to Texas. The truckers eventually destroy half of the town and the jail and rescue Spider Mike. Knowing they will now be hunted by the authorities, the truckers head for the border of Mexico. On the way, Rubber Duck gets separated from the rest of the convoy when the others get stopped by a traffic accident. In a showdown near the United States-Mexico border, Rubber Duck is forced to face Wallace and a National Guard unit stationed on a bridge. Firing a machine gun, Wallace and the Guardsmen cause the truck's tanker trailer to explode, while Rubber Duck deliberately steers the tractor unit over the side of the bridge, plummeting into the churning river below, sending Duck presumably to his death.

A public funeral is held for Rubber Duck. A distraught Melissa is led to a school bus with several "long-haired friends of Jesus" inside. There she finds Rubber Duck in disguise sitting in the back. The convoy takes to the road with the coffin in tow. As the bus passes Wallace, he spots the Duck and bursts into laughter.

Cast

 Kris Kristofferson as Martin 'Rubber Duck' Penwald
 Ali MacGraw as Melissa
 Ernest Borgnine as Sheriff Lyle "Cottonmouth" Wallace of Natosha County, Arizona
 Burt Young as Bobby "Love Machine" "Pig Pen"
 Madge Sinclair as Widow Woman
 Franklyn Ajaye as Spider Mike
 Brian Davies as Chuck Arnoldi
 Seymour Cassel as Governor Jerry Haskins
 Cassie Yates as Violet
 Walter Kelley as Federal Agent Hamilton
 Billy Hughes as Pack Rat
  as Texas Alvarez Sheriff Tiny Alvarez
 Patrice Martinez as Maria
 Donnie Fritts as Reverend Sloane
 Tommy Bush as Chief Stacey Love
 Spec O'Donnell as 18 Wheel Eddie
 Bill Coontz as Old Iguana

Production
Convoy was filmed almost entirely in the state of New Mexico. Production began in 1977 when the CB radio/trucking craze was at its peak, made during the same period as such films as Smokey and the Bandit (1977), Handle with Care (1977), Breaker! Breaker! (1977) and High-Ballin' (1978), as well as the television series Movin' On (1974–1976) and B. J. and the Bear (1979–1981).

During this period of Sam Peckinpah's life, it was reported he suffered from alcoholism and drug addiction. His four previous films, Cross of Iron (1977), The Killer Elite (1975), Bring Me the Head of Alfredo Garcia (1974), and Pat Garrett and Billy the Kid (1973), had struggled at the box office and the director needed a genuine blockbuster success. Unhappy with the screenplay written by B. W. L. Norton, Peckinpah tried to encourage the actors to re-write, improvise and ad-lib their dialogue, with little success. In another departure from the script, Peckinpah attempted to add a new dimension to the film by casting a pair of black actors as members of the convoy: Madge Sinclair as Widow Woman and Franklyn Ajaye as Spider Mike.

Peckinpah's original rough cut of Convoy, assembled by Peckinpah and his long time editor Garth Craven in early 1978, had an estimated running time of 220 minutes. According to the book If They Move ... Kill 'Em!: The Life and Times of Sam Peckinpah by David Weddle and the Convoy documentary Passion & Poetry: Sam's Trucker Movie, Peckinpah's rough cut did not have any musical score other than the title song and "Blow The Gates To Heaven" by Richard Gillis (who had previously worked with Peckinpah on The Ballad of Cable Hogue). Jerry Fielding, who composed music for many of Peckinpah's previous films, was also hired to do the score for Convoy.

After a second screening of Peckinpah's rough cut, EMI executive Michael Deeley fired Peckinpah and Craven from the film in mid-March 1978 and promoted editor Graeme Clifford to supervising editor, to drastically reduce the running time of the film for a June 1978 release. Garner Simmons, author of Peckinpah: A Portrait in Montage, said that EMI and Clifford's version of Convoy "cut the guts out of it".

Questioned about the production of Convoy during an interview in July 1978 Peckinpah is quoted as saying “In preparing Cross of Iron I kept hearing on Armed Forces radio this song about “We’ll hit the gate goin’ 98, Let them truckers roll, Ten-Four!” and I said “By God, I’d like to be out on that highway!” And so I got out there, but I ended up not being there at all.”

The picture finished eleven days behind schedule at a cost of $12 million, more than double its original budget.

The famous scene where the tanker truck goes off a bridge and explodes was filmed in Needles, California, on a one-way bridge over the Colorado River between Arizona and Needles. The Needles City Fire Department provided fire protection during this scene. The bridge was removed soon after as a new span connected the two sides of the river.

Peckinpah has a cameo as a sound man during an interview scene. Rubber Duck's truck is generally represented in the film as a 1977 Mack RS712LST although several other Mack RS700L series trucks were used as a double and as stationary props.  The original 1977 Mack truck, its on-road movie double, and the only original remaining tank trailer are on display at the National Museum of Transportation outside St. Louis, Missouri.

Release
The film was released in Japan in mid-June 1978 before opening in 700 theaters in the United States and Canada on June 28, 1978.

Critical reception
Though Convoy was a commercial success and maintains a robust cult following, it received mixed reviews from critics upon its initial release. It holds an approval rating of 50% on Rotten Tomatoes, based on 16 reviews.

Vincent Canby of The New York Times wrote that the film "has been made before much less expensively and much more entertainingly by directors with no aspirations to be artists. 'Convoy' is a bad joke that backfires on the director. He has neither the guts to play the movie straight as melodrama nor the sense of humor to turn it into a kind of 'Smokey and the Bandit' comedy. The movie is a big, costly, phony exercise in myth-making, machismo, romance-of-the-open-road nonsense and incredible self-indulgence." Arthur D. Murphy of Variety wrote, "Sam Peckinpah's 'Convoy' starts out as 'Smokey And The Bandit,' segues into either 'Moby Dick' or 'Les Miserables,' and ends in the usual script confusion and disarray, the whole stew peppered with the vulgar excess of random truck crashes and miscellaneous destruction ... Every few minutes there's some new roadblock to run, alternating with pithy comments on The Meaning Of It All. There's a whole lot of nothing going on here." Gene Siskel of the Chicago Tribune gave the film 1.5 stars out of 4 and wrote, "Save for a car sailing through the roof of a barn, 'Convoy' is sluggish entertainment, the first road race film in which I rooted for the cops against the good guys. Kristofferson's getting caught would have made a shorter and better picture." Charles Champlin of the Los Angeles Times called the film "a multivehicle wreck of a movie" and "slack stuff, missing as a sizzling love story, missing as the kind of funny anti-authoritarian statement the song was, arriving well past the peak of the CB phenomenon, making no statement one way or the other about trucks or truckers." Gary Arnold of The Washington Post wrote that the film "suggests a shotgun misalliance of 'Billy Jack' and 'Smokey and the Bandit,'" and all Peckinpah could do with the "stupid material" was "to pretend he's getting somewhere by noisily spinning his wheels. More often than not even his visual pyrotechnics falls short, and he's left trying to rationalize nonsensical characters and conflicts by imposing his sentimentalities about men of war on them." John Pym of The Monthly Film Bulletin was generally positive, writing, "What sets this apart from other recent citizen-band road movies is the skill with which Peckinpah redefines the artifacts of the Western, which is what Convoy transparently remains. It has lines of cavalrymen, a cattle drive, a secret trail to Mexico, a circular camp site, innocent bar-room fisticuffs and a hero who, while caring nothing for women, at the same time reveres the married man and his homestead ... The adroitness of mood is perhaps best characterized by the moment when, his audience having been softened by the surrounding exuberance, Peckinpah slips into place such a poignantly sentimental moment as the departure of Spider Mike for his hometown."

Empire gave the film a 3 out of 5 stars, stating "A noisy but enjoyable destruction derby of a film, sadly with none of the subtlety, invention or skill of Spielberg's Duel."

Box office
The film grossed $4 million in Japan in its first 9 days. Convoy was the highest grossing picture of Peckinpah's career, grossing $45 million at the United States and Canada box office.

Home media
On April 28, 2015, Kino Lorber released Convoy on DVD and Blu-ray.

Soundtrack
Features:
 "Convoy" by C. W. McCall (a new version, written especially for the film, with saltier language)
 "Lucille" by Kenny Rogers
 "Cowboys Don't Get Lucky All the Time" by Gene Watson
 "Don't It Make My Brown Eyes Blue" by Crystal Gayle
 "I Cheated on a Good Woman's Love" by Billy "Crash" Craddock
 "Okie From Muskogee" by Merle Haggard
 "Southern Nights" by Glen Campbell
 "Blanket on the Ground" by Billie Jo Spears
 "Keep on the Sunny Side" by Doc Watson
 "Walk Right Back" by Anne Murray

Novelization 
A paperback novelization of the film by screenwriter B.W.L. Norton was published in 1978. A more serious edge and less humor was given to the film's story and there are some changes and additions, such as no mention of Spider Mike being African-American, a definite hatred between Rubber Duck and Wallace, a fight between Rubber Duck and Wallace after Spider Mike is broken out of jail, Widow Woman getting married (for the fifth time) and a background story given to Melissa.

References

External links
 
 
 
 
 
 Review by Scott Vondoviak
 Convoy The Movie
 C.W. McCall: An American Legend

1978 films
1970s road comedy-drama films
American road comedy-drama films
1970s English-language films
Films directed by Sam Peckinpah
Films based on songs
Films set in Texas
Films shot in New Mexico
American road movies
Films about police misconduct
Trucker films
Films about trucks
United Artists films
1970s chase films
EMI Films films
Citizens band radio in popular culture
1978 comedy films
1978 drama films
1970s American films